The 2018 NCAA Division I Outdoor Track and Field Championships were the 97th NCAA Men's Division I Outdoor Track and Field Championships and the 37th NCAA Women's Division I Outdoor Track and Field Championships held for the sixth consecutive year at Hayward Field in Eugene, Oregon on the campus of the University of Oregon. In total, forty-two different men's and women's track and field events were contested from Wednesday June 6 to Saturday June 9, 2018.

Results

Men's events

Men's 100 meters

Needing points in pursuit of the team title, the University of Houston was hoping to score with its three sprinters Cameron Burrell, Elijah Hall, and Mario Burke in the final of the 100 m on June 8. Though a headwind prevented fast times, Burrell and Hall were able to accelerate and out-lean Florida State University's Andre Ewers, considered by some to be the favorite, at the finish to score 18 points in addition to Burke's one point for finish eighth. In a post-race interview with ESPN, Burrell said he dedicated his win in this race to teammate Brian Barazza who fell after leading in the 3000 m steeplechase hours before.

Wind: -0.9

Men's 200 meters

The men's 200 m was won by Texas Tech University's Divine Oduduru on May 8. Running into a strong headwind of 3.1 meters per second, Oduduru ran 20.28 seconds to win the title by only one one-hundredth of a second over 100m contenter Andre Ewers of Florida State University.

Wind: 0.0

Men's 400 meters

Having set the indoor 400 m world record and having not lost a race all year, the University of Southern California's Michael Norman was considered the prohibitive favorite in the men's 400 m on June 8. Before the race, he said his goal was to beat Olympic gold medalist Quincy Watts, his coach's personal best in the event, which would have also been a collegiate record. Despite a fleeting rain, Norman ran conservatively in the beginning but pulled a late charge to win the race in 43.61 seconds, a new collegiate record and a time that made him among the 15 fastest performers of all time. The University of Auburn's Akeem Bloomfield also ran under 44 seconds and his teammate Nathon Allen ran 44.1 seconds, both among the top collegiate times in history, leading some to call the race the greatest collegiate 400m of all time.

Men's 800 meters

The University of Texas at El Paso's Michael Saruni, coming off his collegiate record, was considered the favorite for the men's 800 m on June 8. Texas A&M University's Devin Dixon led the field through a quick 400 m split, and soon Saruni and Penn State University's Isaiah Harris were both in contention with a lap to go. But with 300 meters to go, Saruni abruptly accelerated, leaving him with less energy on the final stretch as Harris and eventually Mississippi State University's Marco Arop passed him, with Harris taking his first NCAA title in a quick personal best time of 1:44.76.

Men's 1500 meters

The University of New Mexico's Josh Kerr was the favorite for the men's 1500 m on June 8 on account of being the defending champion and  collegiate record-holder. Before the race, he had mentioned wanting to break his own collegiate record in the final on June 8, but wet conditions didn't allow it as the field went out in 61 seconds for the first 400 m. In a late surge, the unheralded Ollie Hoare passed Kerr in the final 100 meters to become the University of Wisconsin's first champion in this event in over 40 years.

Men's 5000 meters

Former indoor and outdoor 5000 m champions Justyn Knight and Grant Fisher were among the favorites in the men's 5000 m on June 8. Despite finishing in the last three places in the 10,000 m two days prior to the race, Brigham Young University's three runners were also expected to factor on suspicion that they had purposefully ran the 10,000 m easily to avoid getting disqualified from the meet and focus solely on the 5000 m. Wet conditions and a championship-style tactical race prevented fast times as only one athlete in the field set a personal best. Ultimately, Stanford University senior Sean McGorty finished the strongest as he took the individual title, with his teammate Fisher being passed by Knight in the final ten meters. The strong finish of Stanford runners scored them sixteen points in this event, which contributed to briefly allowing Stanford to lead the overall team title standings.

Men's 10,000 meters

With last year's champion Marc Scott having graduated, the University of Alabama's Vincent Kiprop, a Kenyan transfer from the NCAA Division II school Missouri Southern State University, was considered the favorite. He was helped in the final by fellow Kenyans and Alabama transfers Gilbert Kigen and Alfred Chelanga, who ran together at a quick pace of 4:22 for the first 1600 m. In the next two miles, the pace substantially slowed as Northern Arizona University runners Tyler Day and Matthew Baxter caught up and alternated the lead. The field remained tightly packed, with the top eight athletes less than two seconds apart at 8000 m which Kiprop first passed in 22:59. With two laps remaining, the top six of Kiprop, Day, Baxter, the University of Michigan's Ben Flanagan, Jacob Thomson, and Dillon Maggard began to separate. Kiprop attempted to lengthen his lead with one lap to go, but Flanagan remained in tow and passed Kiprop in the final 50 meters. Directly at the conclusion of the race, he told ESPN cameras, "Where's my mom?" Flanagan's final time of 28:34 was a thirty-nine second improvement over his previous best of 29:13. Flanagan credited staying "as patient as possible" in part for his win. His victory was the first by a Canadian in this event at the NCAA championships since 2012, when Cam Levins won the title.

Men's 110-meter hurdles

Defending champion Grant Holloway of the University of Florida won the men's 110 m hurdles on June 8. Holloway had a fast start and built up a lead 50 meters into the race, but as he approached the finish both the University of Illinois' David Kendziera and Damion Thomas of Louisiana State University began to make up ground, leaning at the finish line but ultimately coming up short.

Wind: -0.9

Men's 400-meter hurdles

The men's 400 m hurdles took place on May 8. The University of Southern California's Rai Benjamin attracted attention during the prelims by stepping twelve times (as compared to the standard thirteen or more) between each hurdle, a feat that only world record holder Kevin Young had notably achieved before. During the final, which took place soon after Southern California teammate Michael Norman set the collegiate record in the flat 400 m, Benjamin stuttered at one of the early hurdles but ultimately pulled away from the field late to run a time of 47.02 seconds. The time was not only a personal best by nearly a full second, but it was also a championship record, Hayward Field facility record, national record for Antigua and Barbuda, an NCAA collegiate record, and the number-two performance of all time, behind only Kevin Young's 46-second performance. The time came as a surprise to many who thought that the wet conditions and puddles on the track were not conducive to running fast times.

Men's 3000-meter steeplechase

There was no clear favorite in the men's 3000 m steeplechase, as the collegiate yearly leader did not qualify and no scoring athletes returned from last year's final. Most expected the race to be tactical due to wet conditions, but the University of Houston's Brian Barraza gapped the field early, taking the race out at an 8:20 pace for the first few laps—a time that was over ten seconds faster than any of the athletes' personal bests. The frontrunning strategy seemed to have been working as Barazza still held a considerable lead going in to the last lap, but a fall on the one of the last barriers allowed the University of Minnesota's Obsa Ali to pass and win the race in a personal-best time of 8:32 minutes. Barraza had trouble getting up after his fall, and ultimately finished tenth. As Houston was considered by some to be a contender for the team title, Barazza's bold race strategy was considered foolish by some but brave by others. After the race, Barraza's coach Steve Magness said that Barraza felt dazed after the race, and that he was considering being checked for a concussion. The fall was later featured on ESPN's SportsCenter.

Men's 4 x 100-meter relay

Despite rain on the track, the University of Houston won the men's 4x100 m in a new collegiate-record time of 38.17 seconds. The prior record had stood for 30 years.

Men's 4 x 400-meter relay

Though the 4 x 400 m was the final men's event of the championships, the team title was already decided as the University of Georgia's points lead was too great for any other team to overtake them in the relays. Nevertheless, the University of Southern California won the event and set a new collegiate record of 2:59.00 minutes. The four-man team included both new NCAA record-holders Michael Norman (in the flat 400 m) and Rai Benjamin (in the 400 m hurdles), and both athletes ran under 44 seconds for their legs to have the two fastest split times in the field. Despite Norman having held the third-fastest split time in history with a 43.03 split at the NCAA West Regional, it was Benjamin who had the faster split of 43.6 seconds in the race on June 8. Norman, who was the anchor, ran largely alone for his leg as he received the baton in the lead and the team won by nearly a full second.

Men's long jump

Men's triple jump

Tahar Triki of Texas A&M University won the men's triple jump on June 8.

Men's high jump

Kansas State University's Tejaswin Shankar won the men's high jump on June 8.

Men's pole vault

Men's shot put

Men's discus throw

Luke Vaughn of Memphis University won the men's discus throw on June 8.

Men's javelin throw

Men's hammer throw

The men's hammer throw took place on June 6. University of Georgia junior Denzel Comenentia set a personal best to win his first NCAA championship.

Decathlon

The men's decathlon began on June 6. Only 18 of the 24 competitors completed the event. British athlete Tim Duckworth of the University of Kentucky led the field by a wide margin after the first five events on June 6, and continued to perform well in the remaining events before sustaining an injury on June 7. He remained in competition despite the injury, and due to his prior lead was able to win the overall points table despite finishing last place in the final 1500 m event.

Women's events

Women's 100 meters

Coming off a 10.91 time in the prelims that was the fourth-best mark in NCAA history, Aleia Hobbs of Louisiana State University was favored to win the women's 100 m on June 9. Heavy rain prevented her from besting that time as she won the event by more than 0.2 seconds, and Hobbs said after the race that the rain was so pervasive that she could not see the track while she was running.

Wind: -0.7

Women's 200 meters

The women's 200 m took place on June 9. Harvard University's Gabby Thomas, the indoor collegiate record holder in this event, faced Lynna Irby of Georgia University, a freshman who had set the meet record in the 400 m. Facing a strong headwind, both of the favorites took the lead at the start but were slowed substantially on the home stretch as the University of Southern California's Angelerne Annelus passed them both from lane 8, the widest lane, to win the race in 22.76 seconds. After the race, Annelus said she was in shock because she had not even been expected to make the final.

Wind: -2.3

Women's 400 meters

University of Georgia freshman Lynna Irby won the women's 400 m in a new meet-record time of 49.80 seconds on June 9. The time was the number-two NCAA performance of all time in this event.

Women's 800 meters

Texas A&M University freshman and high school record-holder Sammy Watson won the women's 800 m on June 9. The race took place during intermittent heavy rain accounting for slower times, and Watson had to dive at the line exhausted to hold off Middle Tennessee State University's Abike Egbeniyi.

Women's 1500 meters

Women's 5000 meters

Women's 10,000 meters

The women's 10,000 m was held on June 7. Defending outdoor 5000 m and 2016 cross country champion Karissa Schweizer of the University of Missouri was favored by some to take the title in her first attempt at the distance at the championships, but she also faced the previous year's 10,000 m champion Charlotte Taylor from the University of San Francisco. A brisk pace set in part by Taylor put the athletes in reach of the NCAA meet record, and soon Schweizer, Taylor, Notre Dame's Anna Rohrer, University of Kansas junior Sharon Lokedi from Kenya, and former NCAA 3000m steeplechase runner-up Alice Wright, from the University of New Mexico, led the race at times alternating the lead. In the end, Lokedi pulled strongly away from the field in the final lap to win in a new championship record time of 32:09.20, followed by University of Louisville freshman Dorcas Wasike, who moved up the field in the final stages to take second. Lokedi had qualified for six NCAA track championship events before and never finished worse than sixth, but had never won an individual NCAA title before the race. Thanks to the fast pace, all of the first six athletes broke the old NCAA meet record, which had been set by Sylvia Mosqueda in 1988.

Women's 100-meter hurdles
Only top eight final results shown; no prelims are listed
Wind: +3.8 mps

Women's 400-meter hurdles
Only top eight final results shown; no prelims are listed

Women's 3000-meter steeplechase

On June 9, Boise State University sophomore Allie Ostrander won the women's 3000 m steeplechase, defending her title from last year's race. She described her strategy as being "relaxed for the first couple of laps and then winding it up," helped by Syracuse University's Paige Stoner who also pushed the pace. She became the first NCAA Division I athlete to win back-to-back steeplechase titles as an underclassman, and the second two-time national champion in Boise State Broncos history.

Women's 4 x 100-meter relay
Only top eight final results shown; no prelims are listed

Women's 4 x 400-meter relay
Only top eight final results shown; no prelims are listed

Women's long jump

Former American record holder in the triple jump, Keturah Orji of the University of Georgia, won the women's long jump on June 7.

Women's triple jump

Women's high jump

Women's pole vault

Women's shot put

Multiple-time collegiate record holder Maggie Ewen of Arizona State University won the women's shot put on June 7.

Women's discus throw

Women's javelin throw

Australian athlete Mackenzie Little won the women's javelin throw on June 7 representing Stanford University.

Women's hammer throw

Heptathlon

The women's heptathlon began on June 8. 20 of the 24 competitors completed the event. The competition was close throughout, but Canadian athlete Georgia Ellenwood of the University of Wisconsin–Madison won the event by scoring more points in the 800 m over second-placer Louisa Grauvogel of the University of Georgia.

Standings

Men
Only top ten teams shown

Women
Only top ten teams shown

See also
 NCAA Men's Division I Outdoor Track and Field Championships
 NCAA Women's Division I Outdoor Track and Field Championships

References

NCAA Division I Outdoor Track and Field Championships
NCAA Division I Outdoor Track and Field Championships
NCAA Men's Outdoor Track and Field Championship
NCAA Women's Outdoor Track and Field Championship